Manfred Dobin (1925-2015) of St. Petersburg, was a stamp dealer and auctioneer, and philatelic expert on Imperial postmarks, 1750-1858 of  Russia. Dobin became a member of the Association Internationale des Experts en Philatéle, AIEP in 1995. He was also a member of the Expert Council on Russian Philately from 1991.

Collecting interests and memberships
The history of the St. Petersburg Post.

Dobin was a member of the Russian Union of Philatelists, the St. Petersburg Union of Philatelists and the Grand Prix Club.

Philatelic literature

Manfred Dobin had access to a number of postal and related archives in Russia. He was one of the first to write a standard work on the postmarks of the Russian Empire.

 Dobin, Manfred, Postmarks of Russian Empire (pre-adhesive period), Standard-Collection, St. Petersburg (1993) 
 Dobin, M.A. & L.G. Ratner, From the History of the Saint-Petersburg Post, 1703–1914, Standard-Collection, St. Petersburg (2004).

Articles in philatelic journals
The postal history of the Russian Empire is the main focus of the work of Dobin. Relating to this subject he has authored articles in Filateliya SSSR (Philately of the USSR), a monthly bulletin published in Moscow since 1966. Some of his articles were translated and published in Rossica.

Honors and awards
Dobin was awarded a major FIP exhibition award: Russia (Grand Prix). During the Soviet period, the collection of M. A. Dobin "From the history of the postmark of Russia" won gold medals at the international exhibitions "Sotsfilex-83" in Moscow and "Sotsfileks-84" in Wroclaw. At POLSKA 93, Large Gold was awarded for his exhibition 'Postal history of Russia'.

See also
 Filateliya
 Philately
 Philatelic literature

References

External links
 Dobin at the official website of the A.I.E.P.

Philatelic literature
Russian philatelists
Businesspeople from Saint Petersburg
1925 births
2015 deaths